David L. Williams, sometimes referred to by his initials, DLW, is an American producer and ADR director (and, occasionally, a voice actor) that has been with ADV Films from the beginning when his living room was used as a production facility for their first show, Devil Hunter Yohko. He left ADV in March 2008 and has since worked at Sentai Filmworks and Seraphim Digital.

David regularly makes appearances at anime conventions as a representative of ADV.  When asked questions about future productions, he often replies with his trademark phrase, "I can neither confirm nor deny."

Production Credits

ADR Director
 All Purpose Cultural Catgirl Nuku Nuku (co-directed with Janice Williams)
 Angelic Layer
 Aquarian Age: Sign for Evolution
 Clannad (co-directed with Janice Williams)
 Clannad After Story (co-directed with Janice Williams)
 D.N.Angel
 Dirty Pair (OVAs only)
 Dirty Pair: Project Eden
 Najica Blitz Tactics
 Pretear
 The Super Dimension Fortress Macross (co-directed with Matt Greenfield and Jin Ho Chung)
 Ushio & Tora (OVA)

References

External links
 
 
 

Year of birth missing (living people)
Living people
American film producers
Place of birth missing (living people)
American voice directors